Gino Vanelli (26 March 1896, in Bergamo – 9 April 1969, in Monza) was an Italian operatic baritone who had an active international career from 1917 until his retirement in 1955. He made several recordings for HMV and Columbia Records, including complete recordings of the operas La boheme, Pagliacci, and Madama Butterfly.

Life and career
Born in Bergamo, Vanelli studied at the Donizetti Conservatory in his native city and with Dante Lari in Milan. He made his professional opera debut in Bergamo in 1917 as Perichaud in  Giacomo Puccini's La Rondine at the Teatro Donizetti. In 1919 he portrayed Barone Douphol in Giuseppe Verdi's La traviata and the Count di Luna in Verdi's Il trovatore at the Teatro Olimpia in Bassano del Grappa. In 1920 he sang the role of Don Carlos in Verdi's La forza del destino in Lodi and the role of Lescaut in Puccini's Manon Lescaut at the Teatro Sociale in Casalmonferrato. He returned to Lodi soon after to sing the roles of Count di Luna and Giannotto in Pietro Mascagni's Lodoletta.

In 1921 Vanelli portrayed Hermann in Alfredo Catalani's Loreley at the  Teatro Comunale in Forli, and in 1922 he sang Sharpless in Puccini's Madama Butterfly at the Politeama Verdi in Cremona. In 1923 he performed the role of Tonio in Ruggero Leoncavallo's Pagliacci at the Teatro all'Aperto in L'Aquila. In 1924 he toured Egypt where he appeared at the Cairo Opera House and at the Teatro Alhambra of Alessandria  in ‘’Lucia di Lammermoor’’ as Lord Enrico Ashton. That same year he toured to Brazil. In 1925 he performed at the Teatro Real in Madrid and appeared as Marcello in Puccini's La bohème at the Teatro Principal in Palma di Majorca.

In 1926 Vanelli made his debut at the Teatro Costanzi in Rome as Escamillo in Carmen with Maria Gay in the title role. That same year he made his debut at La Scala in Milan as Ping in Puccini's Turandot. He remained committed to La Scala as a resident artist for the next 20 years. From 1926-1928 he made numerous appearances at the Teatro Colón in Buenos Aires, including starring roles in the world premieres of Rafael Peacan del Sar's Chrysantheme (1927) and Raúl Espoile's Frenos (1928). Other operas he sang in Buenos Aires were Turandot, Ildebrando Pizzetti's Fra Gherardo, Felice Lattuada's "Le preziose ridicole", and Ottorino Respighi's La campana sommersa.

In 1932 Vanelli appeared in the world premiere of Alfredo Casella's La donna serpente at the Teatro dell'Opera di Roma. He returned there in 1934 to perform in the world premiere of Licinio Refice's Cecilia. In 1935 and 1941 he toured in Holland, and in 1951 he appeared at the Arena di Verona Festival. In 1952 he portrayed Belcore in Donizetti's L'elisir d'amore at the Wexford Festival Opera. In 1954 he  performed in the world premiere of Giulio Viozzi's Allamistakeo at the Teatro delle Novità in Bergamo; a role which he subsequently performed in Venice. His last appearance was as Alessio in Vincenzo Bellini's La Sonnambula at the Teatro Donizetti in Bergamo in October 1955. Other opera houses he appeared at during his career included La Fenice, Teatro Carlo Felice, Teatro Comunale di Bologna, the Teatro Municipal in Rio de Janeiro, the Theatro Municipal in São Paulo, the Teatro Regio in Parma, and the Teatro Regio in Turin.

References

1896 births
1969 deaths
Italian operatic baritones
20th-century Italian male opera singers